The Wombat Hill Botanic Gardens in Daylesford, Victoria, Australia, are included on the Victorian Heritage Register.

Governance
The Wombat Hill (Daylesford) Botanic Gardens are crown land owned by the State of Victoria - Department of Sustainability and Environment.  Hepburn Shire Council is the Committee of Management for the Garden. Hepburn Shire has a Wombat Hill Botanic Gardens Advisory Committee who held the 150 year anniversary of the gardens in 2013.  There is a Friends of the Wombat Hill Botanic Gardens.

The Wombat Hill Botanic Gardens are also known as the Daylesford Botanic Gardens.  They are included on the Victorian Heritage Register as they are of historic, scientific (botanic), and aesthetic significance to the State of Victoria.

Gallery
Photographs of the gardens are found on Flickr. A set of images can be searched in Trove at the National Library of Australia

References

Botanical gardens in Victoria (Australia)
1863 establishments in Australia
Environment of Victoria (Australia)
Gardens in Victoria (Australia)